Passion Pop is an Australian alcoholic beverage, labelled as a "Carbonated passion fruit flavoured juice-based beverage". The product was created by Frank (Pop) Miranda in 1977–78 at the C-Sekda winery (Miranda Wines Pty Ltd) in Griffith, New South Wales. The rights for the product were then sold to Australian Vintage, who now owns and produces the beverage. It comes in four different flavours: original (passion fruit), mixed berry, pink (strawberry), and watermelon.

Specifications
Passion Pop is labelled as a carbonated 'flavoured' juice. The drink is 9.5% alcohol, meaning that one bottle contains 5.6 standard drinks. Passion Pop comes in a 750 ml glass "champagne-style" bottle. It was one of the first beverage products in Australia to utilise a plastic stopper (or "cork").  The Passion Pop label reads "Perfect for sharing with friends, delightfully fruity and refreshing."

References

Australian wine
Premixed alcoholic drinks
Australian companies established in 1977
Food and drink companies established in 1977